Jamie McDonald (born 27 March 1978) is an Australian media personality.

Biography

McDonald grew up in Ballarat, Victoria and attended Mount Clear College. He then went on to study performing arts at Ballarat University.

McDonald was a Big Brother housemate in 2007 where he was evicted after spending 71 days in the house. Previously, he was connected with Fairfax Media and Super Radio Network.

McDonald's other television appearances include a recurring bit part on the Australian television series The Secret Life of Us and as a founding host of video-game based television show Level 3.

McDonald was previously a network announcer with Southern Cross Austereo until he split from the company in 2015.

References

External links 

1978 births
Living people
Big Brother (Australian TV series) contestants
Australian radio presenters